Longmont High School is the original high school of the city of Longmont, Colorado, United States, and opened its doors to students in 1901. The school is located in central Longmont and serves as a high school for the St. Vrain Valley School District.

Athletics
The Longmont High School football team won the national championship in 1908. It went on to win its next Colorado state football championship in 1940, followed by back-to-back state titles in 1954 and 1955. The school is perhaps best known, however, for its record streak, starting in 1988 and ending in 1992, in which the Trojans went 45–0, winning three consecutive championship crowns. This remains the longest winning streak in large-school Colorado football history. In 2018, the Girls swim team won the 3A championship.

Music
The Longmont High School Band commissioned "Joy Revisited" by Frank Ticheli in 2005.
The Longmont High School Band commissioned "Ostinato" by Richard Saucedo in 2010

The Longmont High School Drumline has competed in Percussion Scholastic World (PSW) in 2001; Percussion Scholastic Open (PSO), winning two state championships from 2002 to 2006; Percussion Scholastic National A PSNA (in RMPA competition 2009), from 2007 to 2009, winning state in 2009; and in Percussion Scholastic A (PSA) from 2010 to present. It also travels almost every year to the WGI competitions. It is also a six-time WGI World Championship finalist, placing as follows:

Notable alumni

 Greg Biekert – former linebacker for the Oakland Raiders and Minnesota Vikings
 Vance D. Brand – former NASA astronaut, test pilot, mission commander and engineer
 Walt Clay – former halfback and fullback for the  Chicago Rockets and Los Angeles Dons
 Eric Coyle – former center for the Washington Redskins 
 Eddie Eagan - former U.S. Olympian (gold medalist in boxing and bobsledding) and chairman of the New York State Athletic Commission
 David Pauley – pitcher for the Toronto Blue Jays 
 Vince Rafferty – former center and guard for the Green Bay Packers
 Ed Werder – ESPN NFL analyst

References

Public high schools in Colorado
Educational institutions established in 1901
Longmont, Colorado
Schools in Boulder County, Colorado
1901 establishments in Colorado